This is a list of the schools in Division II of the National Collegiate Athletic Association (NCAA) in the United States and Canada that have women's soccer as a varsity sport. In the 2022 season, there are a total of 250 women's Division II soccer programs.

Conference affiliations are current for the coming 2023 season.

NCAA Division II women's soccer programs

Reclassifying institutions in yellow. Institution that has announced a future departure from Division II in pink.

Future Division II women's soccer programs

See also

List of NCAA Division I women's soccer programs
List of NCAA Division II institutions
List of NCAA Division II men's soccer programs

External links

NCAA Division II Women's Soccer Sponsorship
NCAA Division II Women's Soccer Home

Soccer
United States
NCAA Division II women's soccer
Soccer